The renaming of the cities in India started in 1947 following the end of the British imperial period. Several changes were controversial, and not all proposed changes were implemented.  Each had to be approved by the Central Government in New Delhi.

The renaming of states and territories in India has also taken place, but until the 2010s with actual substantial name changes in both local language and in English such as the old British state name of Travancore-Cochin to Kerala (1956). The most notable exceptions are Indian English spelling-changes of Orissa to Odisha (March 2011) and the union territory of Pondicherry (which includes the city of Pondicherry) to Puducherry.

Causes for renaming

Need for standardisation of spelling
India has various local languages. Even (Romanised) English spellings in long and wide use often vary depending upon which government department or agency uses them. To the point, a few examples are Quilandy vs. Koyilandy, Canannore vs. Kannur, and Rangiya vs. Rangia. Different departments of the government may have used official spellings in use at the time, while locations associated with Indian railways mostly maintained British-era spellings. The confusion inherent in such variations has often resulted in serious consequences like people having two "different" addresses (theoretically designating the same place) in their official records leading to legal disputes, or one house having residents of different house addresses due to differing place names. Many people argue that such confusion can lead to indeterminate and/or unintended consequences.

Renaming in local languages
In the post-colonial era, several Indian states' names were changed. Some of these changes coincided with the States Reorganisation Act of 1956, a major reform of the boundaries of India's states and territories that organised them along linguistic lines. At this time, for example, Travancore-Cochin was renamed Kerala. Later state name changes include the reorganisation of Madhya Bharat into Madhya Pradesh in 1959; and the renamings of the Madras State to Tamil Nadu in 1969, of the Mysore State to Karnataka in 1973, and of Uttaranchal to Uttarakhand in 2007.

Name changes have varied with respect to the levels of language at which they have been applied, and also accepted. Some of these local name changes were changes made in all languages: the immediate local name, and also all India's other languages. An example of this is the renaming of predominantly Hindi-speaking Uttaranchal to a new local Hindi name. Other changes were only changes in some of the indigenous languages. For example, the renaming of the Madras Presidency to Madras State in 1947 and then Tamil Nadu in 1969 required non-Tamil speakers to change from an approximation of the British name ( Madras Presidency, then Madras State ) to a native Tamil name ('Tamil country').

In general, changes to the local names of cities in the indigenous languages are less common. However, a change in English may sometimes also be a reflection of changes in other Indian languages other than the specific local one. For example, the change of Madras ( Madras) to Chennai ( Chennai) was reflected in many of India's languages, and incidentally in English, while the Tamil endonym had always been Chennai and remained unaffected by the change.

Renaming in English

Change in official English spelling
The renaming of cities is often specifically from English to Indian English in connection with that dialect's internal reforms. In other words, the city itself is not actually renamed in the local language, and the local name (or endonym) in the indigenous languages of India does not change, but the official spelling in Indian English is amended. An example is the change from English Calcutta to English Kolkata – the local Bengali name did not change. Such changes in English spelling may be in order to better reflect a more accurate phonetic transliteration of the local name, or may be for other reasons. In the early years after Indian independence, many name changes were affected in northern India for English spellings of Hindi place names that had simply been romanised inconsistently by the British administration – such as the British spelling Jubbulpore, renamed Jabalpur among the first changes in 1947. These changes did not generate significant controversy. More recent and high-profile changes – including renaming such major cities as Calcutta to Kolkata – have generated greater controversy. Since independence, such changes have typically been enacted officially by legislation at local or national Indian government level, and may or may not then be adopted by the Indian media, particularly the influential Indian press. In the case of smaller towns and districts which were less notable outside and inside India, and where a well known English name (or exonym) could not be said to exist, older spellings used under British India may not have had any specific legislation other than changes in practice on the romanisation of indigenous Indian language names.

Realignment of the official Indian English name to an alternative local name
Aside from changes to the official English spellings of local names there have also been renaming proposals to realign the official name, hence the English name with an alternative local name. Ethnically sensitive examples include the proposals by the Bharatiya Janata Party (1990, 2001) to rename Ahmedabad to Karnavati and Allahabad to Prayagraj, the latter ultimately being officially adopted in 2018. These two proposals are changes from the historically Islamic name to a Hindu native name. These can be represented as a change from Urdu language to Hindi language, but since the two languages are variants of Hindustani the proposal is effectively a cultural and ethno-religious proposal rather than a linguistic one.

Adoption of renamed names
Official name changes take place quickly if not immediately in official government sources. Adoption may be slower among the media in India and abroad, and among Indian authors.

Important examples

States 
 Travancore-Cochin → Kerala (1st November, 1956).
 Madhya Bharat → Madhya Pradesh (1st November, 1959)
 Madras State → Tamil Nadu (14th January, 1969)
 Mysore State → Karnataka (1st November, 1973)
 Uttaranchal → Uttarakhand (1st January, 2007)
 Orissa → Odisha (4th November, 2011)
 North-East Frontier Agency (NEFA) → Arunachal Pradesh (20th January 1972)

Cities 
Notable city names that were officially changed by legislation after independence include:

 Sambhajinagar, from Aurangabad, renamed in 2023
 Dharashiv, from Osmanabad, renamed in 2023
 Devgiri, from Daulatabad, renamed in 2023
 Jabalpur, from Jubbulpore, respelled in 1947
 Jajmau, from Jajesmow, respelled in 1948
 Kanpur, from Cawnpore, respelled in 1948
 Vadodara, from Baroda, respelled in 1974
 Thiruvananthapuram, from Trivandrum, respelled in 1991
 Mumbai, from Bombay, renamed in 1995
 Kochi, from Cochin, respelled in 1996
 Chennai, from Madras, renamed in 1996
 Kolkata, from Calcutta, respelled in 2001
 Medininagar, from Daltonganj, renamed in 2004
 Kadapa, from Cuddapah, respelled in 2005
 Puducherry, from Pondicherry, renamed in 2006
 Bengaluru, from Bangalore, respelled in 2007
 Belagavi, from Belgaum in 2007
 Tumakuru, from Tumkur in 2007
 Hubballi, from Hubli in 2007
 Shivamogga, from Shimoga in 2007
 Hosapete, from Hospet in 2007
 Mysuru, from Mysore in 2007
 Kalaburagi, from Gulbarga in 2007
 Chikkamagaluru, from Chikmagalur in 2007
 Vijayapura, from Bijapur in 2007
 Ballari, from Bellary in 2007
 Mangaluru, from Mangalore in 2007
 Rajahmahendravaram, from Rajahmundry in 2015
 Gurugram from Gurgaon in 2016
 Prayagraj, from Allahabad, renamed in 2018
 Atal Nagar, from New Raipur in 2018
 Narmadapuram, from Hoshangabad, renamed  in 2021.

For others, by state order, see list of renamed Indian cities and states.

 Alappuzha, from Alleppey
 Baranagar, from Barahanagore
 Guwahati, from Gauhati
 Indore, from Indhur
 Kanchipuram, from Kāñci-pura And Conjevaram
 Kannur, from Cannanore
 Kollam, from Quilon
 Koyilandy, from Quilandi
 Kozhikode, from Calicut
 Kumbakonam, from ancient name Kudanthai
 Mayiladuthurai, from Mayavaram ancient name Mayuram
 Narmada, from Nerbudda
 Nagaon, from Nowgong
 Nashik (Marathi: नाशिक), from Gulshanabad (Mughal Era)
 Palakkad from Palghat
 Panaji from Panjim
 Pune, from Poona
 Ramanathapuram, from Ramnad
 Sagar, from Saugor
 Shimla, from Simla
 Thalassery, from Tellicherry
 Thanjavur, from British name Tanjore
 Thane, from British name Tannah
 Thoothukudi, from Tuticorin and its short form Tuty
 Thrissur, from Trichur
 Tindivanam, from Tinthirivanam
 Tiruchirapalli, from Trichinopoly and its short form Trichy
 Tirunelveli, from Tinnevelly
 Tiruvallikeni, from Triplicane
 Udhagamandalam, from Ootacamund and its short form Ooty
 Viluppuram, from Vizhupparaiyar And Vizhimaa Nagaram
 Varanasi, from Benares
 Vatakara, from Badagara
 Virudhachalam, from  Vriddhachalam ancient name Thirumudhukundram
 Vijayawada, from Bejawada, anciently Vijayavatika in Mahabharata and Rajendrachola pura during Chola dynasty
 Visakhapatnam, from Waltair, and before that Vizagapatam and its short form Vizag

Town names that derive from ancient names:

 Mandi, derived from Mandav Nagar
 Nellore, in ancient times Simhapuri

Proposed changes
Several other changes have been proposed for states and towns.

States and union territories
 Kerala to Keralam
 
 West Bengal to Bangla

Cities

Bihar 
 Patna to Pataliputra

Gujarat 
 Ahmedabad to Karnavati

Himachal Pradesh
 Shimla to Shyamala

Kerala
 Thiruvananthapuram to Ananthapuri

Madhya Pradesh 
 Bhopal to Bhojpal

Maharashtra
 Ahmednagar to Ahilyanagar
 Islampur to Ishwarpur
 Khultabad to Sant Eknath Nagar
 Churchgate area of Mumbai to Chintamanrao Deshmukh station
Sindkhed Raja to Rajmata Jijau Nagar

Telangana 
 Hyderabad to Bhagyanagaram
 Karimnagar to Yelagandula
 Nizamabad to Indur
 Mahbubnagar to Palamuru
 Adilabad to Eddulapuram
 Mahabubabad to Manukota

Uttar Pradesh
 Muzaffarnagar to Laxmi Nagar

See also

 List of renamed places in India
 List of renamed places in Pakistan
 List of renamed places in South Africa
 Sanskritisation

References

External links
 Geographical Dictionary of Ancient and Mediaeval India by Nundo Lal Dey
 —The Hindu
 12 Cities in Karnataka get a name change—Karnataka.com
 India's Bangalore in name change—BBC News
 Shashi Tharror: Becoming Bengaloorued—Business Standard

Cities and towns in India
India
Geographic history of India
India
History of the Republic of India
Linguistic controversies
Names of places in India